Henry-César Boscal de Réals (Rochefort, 28 March 1723 – Daoulas, 17 October 1795) was a French Navy officer. He notably served during the War of American Independence.

Biography 
Réals was born to a family with a strong naval tradition: his father was a Navy captain, and his two brother were also Navy officers. 

Réals joined the Navy as a Garde-Marine in 1741, and took part in the Battle of Toulon on 22 February 1744 on Espérance. He served on Terrible in 1746, and on Favorite in 1747.

Réals was promoted to Lieutenant in 1756, and appointed to Friponne. He then transferred to Actif and spent four years serving in the Indian Ocean. 

In 1771, Réals rose to Captain.

In 1778, Proisy captained the 74-gun Palmier, part of the White-and-blue squadron under Du Chaffault in the fleet under Orvilliers. He took part in the Battle of Ushant on 27 July 1778. 

He was later promoted to Brigadier, and retired in 1782 with the rank of Chef d'Escadre. During the French Revolution, he was arrested and detained in Daoulas, where he died in 1795.

Sources and references 
 Notes

Citations

References
 
 
 
  (1671-1870)
 

French Navy officers
French military personnel of the American Revolutionary War